Milena is a feminine given name of Slavic origin derived from "mil" meaning "gracious", "pleasant" or "dear". It is the feminine form of the male names Milan and Milen. It is quite popular in Slavic countries such as Serbia, Montenegro, Poland, Bulgaria, the Czech Republic, Ukraine, Croatia, Russia, Belarus, and even in Armenia,  Colombia, Brazil, Argentina, Chile, Cuba, Dominican Republic, Puerto Rico, Spain, Portugal, Romania, Greece, Eritrea, and Italy.

People
 Milena Baldassarri (born on October 16th 2001) Italian rhythmic gymnast
 Milena Canonero (born 1946), Italian costume designer
 Milena Ćeranić (born 1986), Serbian pop-folk singer
 Milena Doleželová-Velingerová, a Czech sinologist
 Milena Dravić (1940–2018), Serbian actress
 Milena Dvorská, Czech actress
 Milena Duchková, Czech athlete
 Milena Gaiga (born 1964), former field hockey player
 Milena Gimón (born 1980), Venezuelan sports journalist
 Milena Govich (born 1976), American actress
 Milena Jesenská (1896–1944), Czech journalist, writer, and translator
 Milena Kaneva (21st century), film producer and director
 Milena Kitic (born 1968), Serbian American operatic mezzo-soprano
 Milena "Mila" Kunis (born 1983), American-Ukrainian actress
 Milena Mayorga (born 1976), former model and beauty pageant contestant who represented El Salvador in Miss Universe 1996
 Milena Pavlović-Barili (1909–1945), Serbian painter and poet
 Milena Rašić (born 1990), Serbian volleyball player
 Milena Reljin (born 1967), Yugoslavian rhythmic gymnast
 Milena Leticia Roucka "Rosa Mendes" (born 1979), Canadian professional wrestler
 Milena Slavova (born 1966), Bulgarian punk-rock singer
 Milena Toscano (born 1984), Brazilian actress and model
 Milena Venega (born 1996), Cuban rower
 Milena Vukotić (1847–1923), Queen of Montenegro
 Milena Vukotic (born 1935), Italian actress
 Milena Nikolova "Milenita" (born 1975), Bulgarian pop and jazz singer

Dissemination 

In 2008, the name Milena became the most popular female name among newborns in Armenia. Also to this day, the name Milena remains in the top popular names of Armenia

See also
 
 Milica, also a Slavic name
 Slavic names

References

Feminine given names
Slavic feminine given names
Belarusian feminine given names
Bosnian feminine given names
Bulgarian feminine given names
Croatian feminine given names
Czech feminine given names
Italian feminine given names
Spanish feminine given names
Portuguese feminine given names
Macedonian feminine given names
Montenegrin feminine given names
Slovak feminine given names
Slovene feminine given names
Polish feminine given names
Russian feminine given names
Romanian feminine given names
Serbian feminine given names
Ukrainian feminine given names